Batracharta is a genus of moths of the family Erebidae. The genus was erected by Francis Walker in 1862.

Species
Batracharta albistrigosata Warren, 1915 north-eastern Himalayas, Thailand
Batracharta chariessa A. E. Prout, 1928 Sumatra
Batracharta chinensis Hampson, 1926 China (Jiujiang)
Batracharta cossoides Walker, [1863] Borneo, Sumatra, Sulawesi
Batracharta divisa Wileman, 1914 Thailand, Peninsular Malaysia, Taiwan, Borneo, Sulawesi
Batracharta irrorata Hampson, 1894 India (Manipur)
Batracharta lempkei Kobes, 1989 Thailand, Sumatra, Borneo, Sulawesi
Batracharta nigritogata A. E. Prout, 1921 Peninsular Malaysia, Borneo, Sulawesi
Batracharta obliqua Walker, 1862 southern India, Thailand, Peninsular Malaysia, Sumatra, Borneo, Philippines, Sulawesi
Batracharta proutae Holloway, 2005 Borneo, Sumatra
Batracharta walkeri Bethune-Baker, 1910 New Guinea

References

Calpinae